Bebelno-Kolonia  is a village in the administrative district of Gmina Włoszczowa, within Włoszczowa County, Świętokrzyskie Voivodeship, in south-central Poland.

The village has a population of 436.

References

Bebelno-Kolonia